The Tata 1510/1512 is the largest selling bus model seen regularly in India and neighbouring countries, and also in the Seychelles. Made by the industrial giant, Tata Motors, it combines good features and low ownership cost.

It has the following features:
 Engine:1512c using Front-mounted Tata-Cummins (Cummins 6BT 5.9L), turbocharged, intercooled.  1510 used TATA's own 697 series engine which is a follower of old TATA - Mercedes Benz Engine. Now it's not in production. And in BS4 era 1613 Bs4 follows the same engine with time required modifications.
 Transmission: Manual, 6 forward + 1 reverse gears, with optional Overdrive Synchromesh
 Steering: Integral Hydraulic Power Assisted Steering
 Brakes: Full air, Dual circuit, S-CAM type

Tata builds the chassis/cowl with engine and other framework. There are many contracted suppliers which in turn build the bodies over the chassis as per customer requirements.

This bus is used by all, from the low cost service providers like state transport, municipal metro bus services to the upmarket private transporters providing low-cost intercity/interstate services.

See also 

 Tata Starbus
 Tata Marcopolo
 List of buses

External links
Khiramotors

1510/1512